Carolyn Kreiter-Foronda (born 1946) was named Poet Laureate of Virginia by the Governor, Tim Kaine, on June 26, 2006. She succeeded Rita Dove and served in this position from June 2006 – July 2008. While serving as Poet Laureate, Carolyn started the "Poetry Book Giveaway Project" and added the "Poets Spotlight" to her webpage highlighting one poet from the Commonwealth each month, in addition to traveling widely to promote poetry in every corner of Virginia.

Carolyn is a lifelong educator and has received numerous literary and academic honors. She gives poetry readings in public and private settings and offers workshops in museums, libraries, and universities. Her service-oriented projects include stints in nursing homes and homeless shelters. From 2010 to 2011, she served as a Literary Arts Specialist with former Virginia Poet Laureate, Claudia Emerson, on a Metrorail Public Art Project conceived by the Art-in-Transit Program of the Washington Metropolitan Area Transit Authority. Juried poems by Virginia writers, including past and present Poets Laureate of Virginia, will be integrated into artistic works by Martin Donlin, Barbara Grygutis, and David Dahlquist at three Tysons Corner metro stations, Tysons East, Tysons Central 7, and Tysons West.

Carolyn is an abstract colorist painter, and her paintings have been featured in solo exhibitions throughout northern, central, and eastern Virginia.

Biography

Early years
Carolyn Kreiter-Foronda was born in Central Virginia in 1946. She spent her youth in Crewe, Pulaski, and Sandston, Virginia. As a young child, Carolyn avidly read poetry and wrote her first poem prior to entering elementary school. Encouraged by her parents, who were both educators, to hone her creative skills, she devoted hours to writing poetry and fiction. Her parents also influenced her decision to become an English and creative writing teacher. Her mother, Lucille Kreiter, was her teacher in fifth and sixth grades.  Her father, Victor Kreiter, Sr., was her high school principal at Highland Springs High School.  While attending high school, she developed an interest in journalism and became a staff member of the school newspaper, Highland Fling. She also served as a Youth Page correspondent for the Richmond News Leader, the city's afternoon daily newspaper. She was inducted into Quill and Scroll, National Honor Society, and the Beta Club. She also belonged to the Interclub Council and Future Teachers of America. During her sophomore year she received a Citizenship Award, and as a senior she was awarded a Future Teachers of America Scholarship and the Dr. Joseph Haven Hoge Memorial Scholarship for university study. Her parents encouraged her to attend Mary Washington College (now the University of Mary Washington), the women's division of the University of Virginia.

A member of Hoofprints, Carolyn won several first-place awards in horse shows and was selected a Reserve Champion, Intermediate Level, in the 1967 Spring Horse Show. During her senior year she served as president of the Student Education Association and as vice-president of the Student Virginia Education Association. In 1969 she graduated with a B.A. in English (Mortar Board).  In 2008 she was inducted into Phi Beta Kappa (Kappa of Virginia) as an alumni member.

Career and higher education
In August 1969, Carolyn started her teaching career at West Springfield High School in Springfield, Virginia. While teaching full-time, she received a Master of Arts, a Master in Education, and a Ph.D. degree from George Mason University, where she studied creative writing under the award-winning poets, Peter Klappert and Ai.  In 1983, she was awarded the first doctorate presented by the school. She won a Scholarship and Service Award and a Letter of Recognition for Quality Research from the Virginia Educational Research Association for her dissertation, Gathering Light: A Poet's Approach to Poetry Analysis. In 2007, she was named Alumna of the Year by both the University of Mary Washington and George Mason University.

Retirement

Educational - After retiring from a 31-year career in education, Carolyn developed a statewide poetry-in-the-schools program at the request of the Poetry Society of Virginia to promote poetry at all instructional levels (K-University). She co-edited with Edward W. Lull an instructional guide, entitled Four Virginia Poets Laureate: A Teaching Guide and secured grant funding to place copies of this book in various educational settings and libraries. She also led an effort through the Poetry Society of Virginia to fund an endowed poetry prize for deserving creative writing students at Virginia colleges and universities. To date, the College Prize, under the auspices of the Academy of American Poets, has been established at the College of William and Mary, the University of Mary Washington, Old Dominion University, the University of Richmond, and Virginia Tech.

After being appointed Poet Laureate in July 2006, Carolyn launched a Poetry Book Giveaway Project. White Pine Press, University of Arkansas Press, and the Poetry Society of Virginia have contributed books, poetry DVDs, and CDs to this effort. Carolyn has distributed these educational materials to universities and high schools throughout Virginia. She set up a Poet's Spotlight Page on her website (www.carolynforonda.com) to highlight the work of poets who have a strong Virginia connection. She devoted countless hours on the road giving poetry readings and workshops throughout the state. During her term as Poet Laureate, the Virginia State Board of Education honored her efforts with a Resolution of Appreciation for her recognition as Poet Laureate and for “her sustained leadership and devotion to promoting the writing and reading of poetry among Virginia's young people and to raising the study of the Arts to the highest level.”

Artistic - Carolyn also works as an abstract artist. She studied art for 17 years in northern Virginia under the award-winning painter, Irene Wood-Montgomery. Her paintings and sculpture have been exhibited in galleries, educational settings, and nursing homes throughout the state of Virginia. Carolyn is an abstract colorist, whose preferred medium is acrylic. Influenced by the non-representational style of Jackson Pollock and by the Washington, D.C. color field painter, Sam Gilliam, Carolyn experiments with color effects to evoke an emotional response from the viewer. Inspired by the late work of Henri Matisse, Carolyn creates textured cut-outs to achieve a representational effect.

Personal life
Carolyn and her husband reside in the River Country region of Virginia, where they have established a Backyard Wildlife Habitat, certified by the National Wildlife Federation. During their leisure time, they enjoy kayaking, Latin dancing and American-style ballroom dancing.

Published works
Carolyn has written poetry, a teaching guide, news articles, book chapters, a booklet; and her work was included in the 2009 Rappahannock Art League Calendar which features 11 poems from River Country.

Poetry books and anthologies
 Urban Voices: 51 Poems from 51 American Poets co-editor with Joyce Brinkman, San Francisco Bay Press, Norfolk, VA (2014) 
 Seasons of Sharing: A Kasen Renku Collaboration (poetry book by Carolyn Kreiter-Foronda and Joyce Brinkman with Catherine Aubelle, Flor Aguilera García, Gabriele Glang, & Kae Morii), Leapfrog Press, Fredonia, NY (2014) 
 The Embrace: Diego Rivera and Frida Kahlo (winner, 2014 Art in Literature: Mary Lynn Kotz Award), San Francisco Bay Press, San Francisco, CA (2013)
 Gathering Light (poetry book, e-version), Northampton House Press, Franktown, VA (2013)
 River Country (poetry book), San Francisco Bay Press, San Francisco, CA (2008)
 Four Virginia Poets Laureate: A Teaching Guide, co-editor with Edward W. Lull, Poetry Society of Virginia (2006)
 Greatest Hits 1981–2000, invitational poetry chapbook series, Pudding House Publications, Johnstown, Ohio (2001)
 In a Certain Place (poetry anthology), co-editor with Alice Tarnowski, SCOP Publications, Inc., Catonsville, MD (2000)
 Death Comes Riding (poetry book), SCOP Publications, Inc., Catonsville, MD (cover photograph by the author) (1999)
 Gathering Light (poetry book, print edition), SCOP Publications, Inc., Catonsville, MD (cover painting and sculpture reproductions by the author) (1993)
 Contrary Visions (poetry book), published under the name, Carolyn Kreiter-Kurylo, Scripta Humanistica, Potomac, MD (cover painting by the author, paperback edition) (1988)

Publication in prize anthologies
 Best of the Literary Journals (2008)
 Anthology of Magazine Verse & Yearbook of American Poetry (1985)

Individual poem publication
Carolyn has published poems widely throughout the country and abroad in magazines, journals and anthologies, including:

In English
After Shocks: The Poetry of Recovery for Life-Shattering Events; Anthology of Magazine Verse & Yearbook of American Poetry; Antioch Review; Autumn Sky Poetry; Bay Splash; Beltway Poetry Quarterly; Best of the Literary Journals; Black Water Review; Blood to Remember: American Poets on the Holocaust; Comstock Review; The Dead Mule; Dominion Review; Eclectica Magazine; El Quetzal; Gloucester Gazette Journal; Hispanic Culture Review; Hungry As We Are; Image/Word: A Book of Poems; Mid-American Review; Negative Capability; Nimrod International Journal; Passages North; Phoebe; Poet Lore; Prairie Schooner; South Florida Poetry Review; Southside Sentinel; Sporting Words Anthology; Terrain.org;
The Other Voices International Cyber-Anthology; The Ghosts of Virginia, Vol. XIII; The Ledge; The Sound of Poets Cooking; Virginia Living; WPFW 89.3 FM Poetry Anthology; among others

Other languages

Carolyn's first poem written in Spanish and English appears in her book, Gathering Light.  Other poems have since been translated into Spanish by Rei Berroa, professor of Spanish and Latin American Studies at George Mason University, and appear in the anthology, Cauteloso engaño del sentito, edited by Dr. Berroa, as part of Colección Libros de la Luna, Vol. No. 2, Santo Domingo, República Dominicana, 2007.

Collaborations
Carolyn works on collaborations with Joyce Brinkman, Poet Laureate of Indiana (2002–2008), and other poets throughout the world. Tipton Poetry Review (Fall 2010, Issue #19) contains a kasen renga written by Carolyn and Joyce, in collaboration with Kae Morii, who translated the poem into Japanese.

Booklet
Instructional Guide, The Capitol Connection, Satellite News Channel, ABC Video Enterprises, Inc., Fall 1983 (co-author, Dr. Michael Kelley, former Director of Television, George Mason University).

Book chapters
"Rita Dove." Laurels:  Eight Women Poets. Ed. Stacy Tuthill. Catonsville: SCOP Publications, Inc., 1998.
"Teaching the Skill of Analyzing for Tone." Teaching Thinking Skills: A Handbook for Secondary School Teachers. By Barry K. Beyer. Boston: Allyn & Bacon, Inc. 1991, pp. 225–247.

Articles (most notable)
"Beyond the Numbers." Muscarelle Museum of Art at the College of William & Mary. (Spring/Summer 2009).
"Poetry Up Front." Virginia Journal of Education (April 2008) 11–14.
"Art-Inspired Writing." Art Line (May 2004) 4–6.
"A Stroll on Top of the World." Patagonian Winds No. 2 (Fall 1997) 41–43.
"A Scottish Lesson in Loyalty." Educational Travel Review (Spring 1996) 10–11.
"Gifts That Keep on Giving." Educational Travel Review (Fall 1996) 21–22.
"Krazy Karmas." Educational Travel Review (Fall 1995) 17.
"Rain over Venice." Educational Travel Review (Winter 1995) 27.
"Paradise in the Clouds." Educational Travel Review (Winter 1993–94) 8–9.
"Teacher Perspectives." The Apple 12:3 (1992) Back cover.
"The Creative Process of Poetry Writing." Journal of Teaching Writing 2:2 (Fall 1983) 167–179.
"Computers and Composition." The Writing Instructor 2:4 (1983) 174–181.
"Working with the ESL Student: Learning Patience, Making Progress." (co-author, Dr. Christopher J. Thaiss)  The Writing Center Journal (Spring/Summer 1981) 41–46.
 "All About Light: William Stafford." (Interview) Phoebe 10:2 (1980) 41–47.
"Inservice in School Divisions." VACTE 1979 Summer Conference Proceedings. Fairfax, VA: George Mason University. 1980, 43–47.

Other
   Book Review of Claudia Emerson’s Figure Studies (University of Mary Washington Magazine, Fall/Winter 2008)
   4th Grade Virginia SOL Daily Reading Reviews. Ed. Jenny Funk and Margaret Thompson. “Reading Selection: Azucena's Arpillera” by Carolyn Kreiter-Foronda. (March 2007: Thunks, Inc.)
   The Richmond News Leader (multiple articles on school youth)
   New Mexico Humanities Review (book review)
   Bolivian Times (travel article)
   ETRAV website (travel article)

Honors, awards and fellowships

Honors

Poet Laureate of Virginia, appointed by Governor Timothy Kaine (2006–2008)
Induction, Phi Beta Kappa (Kappa of Virginia), alumni member, University of Mary Washington (2008)
Honored Guest, President's Luncheon, NLAPW Biennial Convention, Alexandria, VA (2008)
Master Poet, Arlington Arts Center, Arlington, VA (2007)
Honorary Member, Tennessee State Poetry League (2007)
Honorary Lifetime Member, The Virginia Writers Club (2006–present)
Honorary Lifetime Member, Chesapeake Bay Writers (2006–present)
Honored at West Springfield High School in Fairfax, VA (2006) Carolyn Kreiter-Foronda Day

Awards
Art in Literature: Mary Lynn Kotz Award, The Embrace: Diego Rivera and Frida Kahlo (2014)
Third Annual Ellen Anderson Award, Poetry Society of Virginia, (2011)
Special Merit Poem, "The Two Fridas, 1939," Comstock Review (2009)
Poem "Do You Know about the Raintree?"  selected by Best of the Literary Journals (2008)
Lifetime Membership Award, Poetry Society of Virginia (2008)
Honored Poet, Art on the Half Shell, Middlesex Art Guild, Urbanna, VA (2008)
Pushcart Prize nominations by journals and/or presses (twice in 2012; once in 2008, 2001, 1996, and 1993)
George Mason University’s Distinguished Alumna of the Year Award (2007)
University of Mary Washington’s Distinguished Alumna of the Year Award (2007)
Resolution of Appreciation for Sustained Leadership and Devotion to Promoting the Writing and Reading of Poetry among Virginia's young people (Presented by the Virginia Board of Education ) (2006)
First Place Award in Poetry Competition, National League of American Pen Women, Chesapeake Bay Branch (2005)
The Neuman Award and The Terrell Award, National League American Pen Women, Morning Glory Gallery, Gloucester, VA (2005)
Multiple Awards in Poetry, National League of American Pen Women, Chesapeake Bay Branch (2002, 2004)
Teacher of the Year Award, selected by class of 1999, West Springfield High School, Fairfax County, VA (1999)
Hodgson Award for Excellence in Teaching English, Fairfax County School Board (1997)
Rotary Meritorious Educator of the Year Award (1997)
National Scholastic Teacher Portfolio Award, (one of 5 recipients in USA) (1997)
Recognition, Outstanding Educator, National Scholastic Art and Writing Awards (1996)
Fairfax County Board of Supervisors’ Recognition Award, Excellence in Writing Instruction (1996)
Recognition, Outstanding Educator, National Foundation for the Advancement of the Arts (1994)
Fairfax County Board of Supervisors' Recognition Award, Contributions to the Commonwealth of Virginia in writing instruction (1994)
Edgar Allan Poe Poetry Award, First Place, "On Sturgeon Creek," Poetry Society of Virginia Adult Poetry Contest (1993)
Virginia Cultural Laureate Award in American Literature, poetry (invested for life into the VA Cultural Laureate Society by Governor Douglas Wilder) (1992)
Third Prize, Passages North Poetry Competition (1986)
First Place, Spree Poetry Award, featured in Riverstone, Poets of the Foothills Arts Center (1984–1985)
Multiple Phoebe poetry awards (1983)
First-place award, nationwide contest, Alexandria Pen Women (1981)

Fellowships and grants
Phi Delta Kappa Grant, "Award for Excellence: Technology in the Classroom" (1999)
Multiple Grant awards, Association of Fairfax Professional Educators (1994–1999)
Fellowship, Independent Study in the Humanities, "The Poetry of Pablo Neruda," Council for Basic Education (1991)
Jenny McKean Moore Fellowship, poetry, George Washington University, Washington D.C. (1990)
Arts-on-the-Road grant recipient, Virginia Commission for the Arts (1989)
Grant, Virginia Center for the Creative Arts (funding for visiting writers: Henry Taylor, Peter Klappert, and Garth Tate) (1989)
Area IV Mini-Grant Award, Fairfax County Public Schools (1989)
Three Artist-in-Education Study Grants, Virginia Commission for the Arts (1986, 1987, 1988)
Mini-Sabbatical Grant, Fairfax County Public Schools (1988)
Grant Award, Writing Instruction, Fairfax County Public Schools (1981)
Sabbatical Leave Grant, Fairfax County Public Schools (1980–1981)

Painting and art exhibits
Paintings and sculpture have been exhibited in galleries, educational settings, and nursing homes throughout the state of Virginia, including the Paul R. Cramer Arts Gallery at the Steward School in Richmond (solo); Petersburg Public Library (solo); Fredericksburg Center for the Arts (solo); Yates House Gallery; The Tides Inn; Labor Day Show in Kilmarnock; Rappahannock Art League; Bay School; Sunrise Gallery, and many others.  Paintings displayed at the Yates House and Blue Skies Gallery events were inspired by Carolyn's poems.

Carolyn has also served as a judge of regional arts shows in eastern Virginia, including art exhibits at The Bay School of the Arts in Mathews, Virginia, Yates House in Deltaville, Virginia, and Blue Skies Gallery in Hampton, Virginia.

Academic positions and work experience 

Independent Writing Consultant, Poet and Artist—Includes stints teaching art-inspired writing workshops for the Phillips Collection and the Virginia Museum of Fine Arts’ Statewide Partnership program (2000—present)
Artist-in-Residency, Richmond Community High School, funded by the Virginia Commission for the Arts and the Richmond Public Schools (2011)
Residency, “Poetry Comes Alive,” Kersey Creek Elementary School, funded by Hanover Education Foundation and PTA funds
Artist-in-Residency, Lancaster High School, funded by the Virginia Commission for the Arts and the Virginia Museum of Fine Arts and organized by the Rappahannock Art League (2009)
Fairfax County Public Schools: English Specialist in Area II Administrative office; Writing Resource Teacher in Area III Administrative office; Teacher of Advanced Placement English and Creative Writing I, II, III; English Department Chairperson; Director, Writing Center, West Springfield High School (1969—2000)
Teacher/Consultant in Writing, Northern Virginia Writing Project, George Mason University (1978—2000)
Adjunct Professor, George Mason University (1985–1989)
Poet/Artist, Poetry in the Schools, Alexandria City Public Schools, Virginia (1985—1987)
Creative Writing Instructor, workshops for young poets, Writer's Center, Bethesda, Maryland (1981–1983)
Instructor, The Writing Place, George Mason University (1980—1981)
Coordinator, George Mason University's Conference on the Teaching and Writing of Poetry and Fiction (1980)
Television Host, Cable Television, Channel 21, School scene, Red Apple, Fairfax County Public Schools (1993–1998)
TV Host, Cable Television, Channel 21, production of “Focus On,” Interviewed teachers, K–12, volunteer parents, and students, Fairfax County Public Schools (1991–1992)
Guest, Multicultural Show, A Rainbow of Colors, Channel 25, Fairfax County Public Schools (1992)
Host, Cable Television, Channel 21, production of Teacher Feature, Fairfax County Public Schools (1988–1991)

Other positions, posts and appointments

Executive Director, Poetry Society of Virginia (2007-2013)
Poetry in the Schools Director, Poetry Society of Virginia (2001-2006)
Poetry Editor with Jane Ellen Glasser, Issue #1, Lady Jane's Miscellany, San Francisco Bay Press
Board of Directors, Yates House Fine Art and Craft Gallery (2006–2008)
Board of Directors, Chick Cove Association, Inc. (2004–2006)
Appointed Member, The Poetry Committee of the Greater Washington, D.C.
Editorial Board, SCOP Publications, Inc. (1993–2000)
Consulting Editor for San Francisco Bay Press (2008–2009)
Alumni Board of Directors, George Mason University (Dean's representative, College of Education and Human Services 1987–1989; Graduate Dean's representative, 1989–1990)
Virginia Regional Advisory Board, National Scholastic Magazines (1979–1980)
Virginia Association of Teachers of English Speakers’ Bureau (1979–1999)

Memberships
Friends of the Trible Library, Christopher Newport University (2010–2012)
Member, Kappa of Virginia, Phi Beta Kappa (2006–present)
Member, Katherine Anne Porter Society (2005–present)
Lifetime member, Poetry Society of Virginia
Member, National League of American Pen Women, Chesapeake Bay Branch
Member, Associated Writers Programs

Speaker / workshops / presentations / panels

Muscarelle Museum of Art, Williamsburg, VA
Block Island, Rhode Island
Arts Alive, West Point, VA
Writer's Center, Bethesda, MD
Middleburg Library, Middleburg, VA
Beverly Street Studio, Staunton, VA
Studio Gallery, Kilmarnock, VA
Arlington Arts Center, Arlington, VA
The Venue of 35th Street, Norfolk, VA
40th Street Stage, Norfolk, VA
Uptown Gallery, Richmond, VA
Studio 9, Tappahannock, VA

2007 VATE Conference Speaker, Northern Virginia
Virginia Museum of Fine Arts teacher workshops, VA
Osher Lifelong Learning Institute, Fairfax, VA
James River Writers Conference, Richmond, VA
2010 Convocation Speaker, Virginia Intermont College, VA
National League of American Pen Women, Richmond Branch, Richmond, VA
Dimview Chapters for the visually impaired in VA (volunteer work)
CCNV Homeless Shelter, Washington, D.C. (volunteer work)
Iliff Nursing Home, Dunn Loring, VA (volunteer work)
Manassas Lifelong Learning Institute, Manassas, VA
Chesapeake Bay Writers, Tidewater area of VA
and others

2008 Keynote Speaker at the Christopher Newport University Writers’ Conference, Newport News, VA
The Phillips Collection (Art-Inspired Poetry Workshop: Degas to Diebenkorn) Washington, D.C.
The Phillips Collection: "Poetry in the Gallery Inspired by the Société Anonyme" Washington, D.C.

Workshops for professionals
Carolyn is an educator's educator, providing workshops for professionals on how to improve and incorporate literature, especially poetry, into the curriculum. She has provided sessions to teachers, as well as administrators, from Kindergarten through 12th to University levels.  Topics include:

“Learning Styles”
"Ekphrastic Poetry"
“Andean Folklore”
“The Writing Process”
“How to Write a Grant”
“The Incas and Poetry”
“How to Raise SAT Scores”
“Science Writing for Students”
“Establishing a Writer's Center”
“Geometric Art and Learning Styles”
“The Creative Voice in the Humanities”
“The Creative Process of Poetry Writing”

“Writing and the Learning Disabled Student”
“How to Implement the 4-Phase Writing Process”
“Writing and the Academically Unsuccessful Student”
“Creative Writing for All Students”
“Thinking Skills in the English Curriculum”
“Writing Memos: A Workshop for Secretaries”
“Teaching Creative Writing in the Nursing Home”
“Free Verse Poetry: What It Is and How to Teach It”
“Establishing a Reading Writing Group in the School Setting”
“Central American literature in the Social Studies Curriculum”
“Organizing a Writers-in-the-Schools Program Featuring Minority Writers as Role Models”
and many others

Articles / book reviews / interviews / feature stories about Kreiter-Foronda

2009 to present 
Radio Interview. XTRA 99.1 FM. Gloucester, VA. May 24, 2013.
Chowning, Larry. "Hardyville Poet Featured in Anthology." Southside Sentinel. May 23, 2013, A8.
"Virginia's Poet Laureate to Visit Gloucester." Gloucester-Mathews Gazette-Journal. May 23, 2013, 5A.
Price, Leah. "Poets Laureate Offer Verses that Inspire." Daily Press. April 26, 2013, P1.
McFarland, Laura. "Poet Laureate Offers Workshop at MSV." The Winchester Star. April 5, 2013.
Akers, Mary. "An Interview with Carolyn Kreiter-Foronda." r.kv.r.y. quarterly literary journal. vol. 6. #2 (Spring 2011) article includes two paintings by Carolyn, as well as conversation about Diego Rivera and Frida Kahlo, topic of forthcoming book.
 Thomas, Margo. "Student Inspired by Poetry Lecture." Virginia Intermont College. November 5, 2010.
Douglas, Keri. "An Interview with Carolyn Kreiter-Foronda" with Keri Douglas, April 10. 2009. AUDIO only Audio only:second location.

2008 
Television Interview. Virginia Currents. WCVE, WHTJ, WCVW. January 10, 2008.
"Poet Laureate Pens New Book." Southside Sentinel. March 20, 2008, A12.
Radio Interview. XTRA 99.1 FM. Gloucester, VA, April 14, 2008.
"Power of Poetry," The Richmond Dispatch. April 14, 2008
"Poet Laureate Visits Library." The Progress Index. April 23, 2008, A3.
Malone, Mandy. "Near-Death Experience Fuels Author's Exploration of Life." Daily Press. April 27, 2008, G12.
Ruehlmann, Bill. "In New Volume, Poet Laureate Finds Romance in the Ordinary." The Virginian-Pilot. May 18, 2008, p. 62.
Blaine, Michael. "Carolyn Kreiter-Foronda's River Country." The Broadkill Review. Volume 2. Issue 3. May 2008, p. 60.
"Book Report: River Country." University of Mary Washington Magazine. Summer 2008, p. 47.
Kirk, Kristen De Deyn. "The Show-It Poet." Hampton Roads Magazine. July/August 2008, p. 41.
Halstead, Nancy. "Cool Weather Reading: River Country." Pleasant Living. September/October 2008, p. 42.
"Alumni Return to Class." University of Mary Washington Magazine. Fall/Winter 2008.
Clark, Susannah. "Profiling a Well-Versed Alumna." The Bullet. November 19, 2008.
Television Interview. "Woman's World." Gloucester, Virginia, Fall 2008.

2007 
Lohmann, Bill, "Spreading the Joy of Poetry." The Richmond Times-Dispatch. January 14, 2007, G1, G3.
"Dancing the Mambo in Gloucester." Glo-Quips. January 25, 2007, p. 1.
Rich, Colleen Kearney. "Virginia's Poet Laureate Visits Campus Today." GMU Gazette. March 1, 2007.
Williams, Ruth Baja. "Virginia's Poet Laureate." South County Chronicle. March 30, 2007, pp. 1, 5.
Kimm, Mary. "Why Not a Poet Laureate." The Connection, April 5, 2007.
"Celebration of Distinction: Carolyn Kreiter-Foronda, Alumna of the Year." Mason Spirit. Spring 2007, p. 8.
Van Mullekom, Kathy. "Learn a Lot from a Laureate." Daily Press. April 28, 2007, B5.
“UMW to Honor Distinguished Alumni during Reunion Weekend.” UMW News. June 1, 2007.
Oral History Interview. Fenwick Library, George Mason University, June 8, 2007. 	
"Distinguished Alumni Honored during Reunion Weekend." UMW Today. Fall 2007. Vol. 31. No. 3, p. 32.
King, Martha Anne. "Nurturing Your Writing Instinct." Chesapeake Style. October 2007.
Malone, Mandy. "Poet Laureate's Website Highlights Virginia Poets." Daily Press, June 24, 2007.
Glose, Bill. "Life Lessons from Poet Laureate Carolyn Kreiter-Foronda." UpFront. Virginia Living, December 2007.

2006 
Robertson, Erin. "Interview: Carolyn Kreiter-Foronda." Marauder, April 6, 2006.
Rich, Colleen Kearney. "Mason Alumna is New Virginia Poet Laureate." The Mason Gazette, June 30, 2006.
Chowning, Larry. "Governor Names Hardyville Writer Virginia Poet Laureate." Southside Sentinel. July 6, 2006, A1, A8.
Cawley, Jon. "Mid-pen Poet Gets State Honors" Daily Press. July 18, 2006, C1–C2.
Cawley, Jon. "Emotional Shock Sparks Life of Poetry: Mary Washington Grad Named State Laureate." Daily Press. July 18, 19, 2006, C1–C2.
Cerullo, Bob. "Lions Club." Southside Sentinel. September 21, 2006, A9.
Gittoes-Singh. "About the Author: Twice a Poet Laureate." The Pen Woman. September 2006, p. 11.
VFH Radio Interview (Sondra Woodward, Reporter), September 29, 2006.
Rich, Colleen Kearney. "A Way with Words." Mason Spirit. Fall 2006, p. 25.
Bright, Anita. "TC Spotlight: NVWP TC Named Poet Laureate." The Journal of the Virginia Writing Project. Volume 27. Issue 2. 2006, p. 6.
Healy, Amber. "Laureate Comes Home." The Springfield Connection. November 23–29, 2006, pp. 4, 8.
Billingsley, Anna. "Alumna Named Poet Laureate." University of Mary Washington Today. Winter Issue, 2006, p. 25.

2000–2005 
Cook, Carol. "An Evening of Art, Jazz, and Poetry." The Pen Woman. February 2005, p. 5.
"Presentation of Bulgarian and American Poetry in Sofia." Bulgarian Diplomatic Review. Issue 7–8 (2003), 136–137.
Abbott, Amy. "Danville Community College Presents 21st Annual Celebration of the Arts." Vol. 8. No. 3, April 2003.
"Poet Carolyn Kreiter-Foronda to Speak on Writing Process in Poetry." The Pulse of IB. Vol. 1. Issue 4, 2003.
"Poetry Interview with Carolyn Kreiter-Foronda and Denise DeVries." Thea Marshall Show. Windy 105, December 2002.
"Five Published Poets Scheduled for Reading July 21." Rappahannock Record, July 11, 2002.
"Prizes Awarded for Paintings, Writings." Rappahannock Record. April 18, 2002, A3.

pre 2000 
"Renaissance Woman." The Free Lance-Star's Weekly Guide to Entertainment and Leisure. November 6, 1997, pp. 12–13.
Allen, Frank. "Restless Visions." (Includes review of Contrary Visions) Poet Lore. Vol. 83. No. 2, 1989, pp. 49–54.
Bell, Melissa. "Reviews." (Gathering Light) Visions. No. 45, 1994.
"The Art Bank Sponsors Poetry Workshops." The South Hill Enterprise. May 17, 1989, 4B.
Burke, Deborah. "Poet, Sculptor, Humanitarian: Burke's Carolyn Kreiter-Kurylo Shares Her Many Gifts with the Homeless." The Connection. July 6, 1989, p. 21.
Burke, Deborah. "Renaissance Teacher." The Connection. September 6, 1989, p. 27.
Hammack, Georgia. "Miscellaneous: Writing Poetry," The South Hill Enterprise, June 14, 1989.
Lynskey, Ed. "Review of Contrary Visions." The Southern Humanities Review. Vol. 23. No. 3. Summer 1989, pp. 285–287.
McNatt, Linda. "Poet Sees Poetry as Door to Creativity." The Sun. May 11, 1989, p. 10.
"Poet to Visit Here on Grant." The Times. Smithfield, VA. April 26, 1989, 10.
"Poetry Lessons." The Times. May 10, 1989, B-1.
Moore, Lenard. "Contrary Visions Shows Poet as Visual Artist." The Pilot. Southern Pines, North Carolina. Vol. 69. No. 72, July 10, 1989.
Black, Harold. "Reviews." (Contrary Visions) Visions. No. 28, 1988.
Kennedy, Kathleen. "For Some, Dimview Lights the Darkness." The Washington Post. August 18, 1988, Virginia Weekly section.
Fanshel, Fran. "Words on Words." The Columbia Flyer. November 10, 1988, p. 103.
Cascio, Chuck. "How to Make Words Work." The Connection. May 22, 1986, p. 15.
"Techniques in the Creation of Poetry and Art." Teacher Feature of Carolyn Kurylo. SchoolScene with host John Duncan. Cable TV. Channel 21. September 20–26. 1986, 4:30, 8:00, and 10:00 p.m.
Smith, Karin. "A Few Words on Teachers and Publishing." NVWP Newsletter. February 1985, pp. 6–7.
Carlos, Andrea. "For Jack of Arts Kurylo, Creativity is Focus." The Times. August 29, 1985, p. 7.
Tavares, Traci and Lisa Melchiori. "Carolyn Kreiter-Kurylo: Profile of the Artist." The Heritage. 1983–84, p. 6.
Donovan, Rose Marie. "GMU Awards 1st Doctorate in 10 Years." The Fairfax Journal. May 23, 1983, A1, A4.
"Carolyn Kurylo: Artist as Teacher." ETA-NV Newsletter. September 1983, pp. 4–5.
Farley, Charlotte. "George Mason's First Doctorate Combines Creativity with Education." GMU Today. Summer 1983, p. 2.
"First GMU PhD Learned for the Sake of Learning." The Alexandria Gazette. Summer 1983.
Brelis, Matthew. "Acclaimed Poets, Writers to Teach GMU Workshops." The Washington Star. April 2, 1981, B-2.
Churchman, Deborah. "Nursing Home Poets Rediscover ‘Self-Worth." The Washington Post. August 6, 1981, VA-11.
Hayden, Mindy. "Hooked on Poetry" Letters to the Editor. The Washington Post, August 14, 1981.

References

External links
Carolyn Kreiter-Foronda website www.carolynforonda.com
Poets Laureate of Virginia from the Library of Congress, Washington, D.C.
The Poetry Society of Virginia website
Virginia Commission for the Arts, News, "New Virginia State Poet Laureate"
The Journal of Teaching Writing
Virginia Journal of Education at the Virginia Education Association's website

1946 births
Living people
Educators from Virginia
American women educators
American women poets
Writers from Richmond, Virginia
People from Pulaski, Virginia
University of Mary Washington alumni
George Mason University alumni
2006 in the United States
Poets from Virginia
Artists from Virginia
People from Farmville, Virginia
Poets Laureate of Virginia
20th-century American poets
People from Crewe, Virginia
21st-century American poets
20th-century American women writers
21st-century American women writers
People from Henrico County, Virginia